G. Bhuvaraghan ( – 23 February 2014) was an Indian politician and Member of the Legislative Assembly of Tamil Nadu. He was elected to the Tamil Nadu legislative assembly as an Indian National Congress candidate from the Vridhachalam constituency in 1962, 1967 elections and as a Janata Party candidate in the 1989 election.

References 

Indian National Congress politicians from Tamil Nadu
Tamil Nadu ministers
2014 deaths
Date of birth missing
India MPs 1977–1979
Lok Sabha members from Tamil Nadu
Year of birth uncertain
Janata Party politicians
People from Cuddalore district